Turkey Creek is a stream in Boone County in the U.S. state of Missouri. It is a tributary of Bonne Femme Creek. Turkey Creek was named for the wild turkeys along its course. It is one of three large creeks in Three Creeks Conservation Area.

See also
List of rivers of Missouri

References

Rivers of Boone County, Missouri
Rivers of Missouri